Cassia leiandra, the mari-mari, is a species of flowering plant in the family Fabaceae, native to Colombia and Brazil, and introduced to Uganda. Its succulent, bittersweet fruit are frequently sold in markets in the Amazon.

References

leiandra
Flora of Colombia
Flora of Brazil
Plants described in 1870